Logan City School District is a school district located in Logan, Utah, United States. As its name indicates, it serves the city of Logan (while the Cache County School District serves surrounding communities within Cache County).   It is one of 41 school districts within the state and 24th largest in terms of student enrollment.

Schools
The following are schools within the Logan City School District:

Elementary schools

 Adams Elementary School
 Bridger Elementary School
 Ellis Elementary School
 Hillcrest Elementary School
 Riverside Elementary School
 Wilson Elementary School
 Woodruff Elementary School

Middle schools

 Mount Logan Middle School

High schools

 Logan High School

See also

 List of school districts in Utah
 Cache County School District

Notes

References

External links
 

School districts in Utah
Logan, Utah
Education in Cache County, Utah